Douglas Grove may refer to one of the following places in the United States:

 Douglas Grove, West Virginia
 Douglas Grove Township, Custer County, Nebraska